Mark Webber may refer to:

Mark Webber (racing driver) (born 1976), Australian racing driver
Mark Webber (actor) (born 1980), American actor
Mark Webber (guitarist) (born 1970), English guitarist with the band Pulp
Mark Webber (political scientist) (born 1964), British political scientist

See also
Marc Weber (disambiguation)